Worcester woman is a political term used by polling companies in the United Kingdom. It profiles or describes a type of median voter, a working class woman in her 30s with two children who worries about quality of life issues and has little interest in politics. Not necessarily hailing from the West Midlands city of Worcester, Worcester woman has been described as an important swing voter when it comes to deciding elections.

It has been perceived to represent someone who would previously have voted Conservative but would likely be swung to vote for Tony Blair's Labour Party by the New Labour rebranding. This electoral sector was particularly targeted in the 1997 and 2001 UK general elections. The Worcester constituency is a noted marginal seat which elected its first ever Labour MP in 1997. It subsequently returned to the Conservatives in 2010.

Worcester woman has also been used as a pejorative term  to describe a woman with consumerist views and a shallow interest in politics, leading her to decide her vote based on issues raised during the election campaign, and therefore likely to vote for whichever political party has the most effective spin.

See also

Bellwether
Essex man
Holby City woman
Person having ordinary skill in the art
Placeholder name
Politics of the United Kingdom
Price of milk question
Middle England
Motorway man
Soccer mom
Workington man

References

External links
CNN piece from 1997, makes comparison to 'soccer mom'
 'Worcester Woman'

Elections in the United Kingdom
Woman
Political terms in the United Kingdom
Polling terms
Stereotypes of working-class women
Working-class culture in England